Tip is the nickname of:

 R. E. Foster (1878-1914), English cricketer and footballer
 Tip Logan (1927-2007), Canadian football player
 Tip Marugg (1923-2006), Dutch-Curaçaoan writer and poet
 Aaron S. Merrill (1890-1961), American vice admiral
 Tip O'Neill (1912-1994), American politician
 Tip O'Neill (baseball) (1858-1915), Canadian Major League Baseball player
 Tip Snooke (1881-1966), South African cricketer
 Tip Tipping (1958-1993), English film and television stuntman and actor 
 Tip Williams (1900-1974), Welsh cricketer

See also
 Tipper Gore (born 1948), American author, photographer, and social issues advocate, wife of former Vice President Al Gore

Lists of people by nickname